al-Zabadani District is a district of the Rif Dimashq Governorate in southern Syria. Administrative centre is the city of al-Zabadani. At the 2004 census, the district had a population of 63,780.

Until February 2009, the sub-districts of Ayn al-Fijah and al-Dimas were part of Al-Zabadani District before being incorporated to form the newly established Qudsaya District.

The town-resort of Bloudan in the al-Zabadani district is a favourite tourist destination for locals and foreigners.

Sub-districts
The district of al-Zabadani is divided into three sub-districts or nawāḥī (population as of 2004):

Settlements
According to the Central Bureau of Statistics (CBS), the following villages, towns and cities make up the district of al-Zabadani:

References

 
Districts of Rif Dimashq Governorate